Sioni may refer to:

Sioni (townlet), a townlet in Mtskheta-Mtianeti region on List of cities and towns in Georgia (country)
Sioni people

See also 

Sion (disambiguation)
Zion